Solomon "Momy" Levy MBE JP (26 October 1936 – 22 December 2016), was a Gibraltarian estate agent and the Mayor of Gibraltar. He held office from 1 August 2008 to 31 July 2009.

A member of the Gibraltarian Jewish community, Levy was the nephew of Sir Joshua Hassan and was an estate agent before he took office. He founded Solomon Levy FRICS in 1960. Levy served 18 years with the Gibraltar Defence Force and was the unit's first Jewish officer.

The city of Funchal, Madeira, and Gibraltar were twinned on 13 May 2009 by their then mayors, Miguel Albuquerque and Solomon, who had been an evacuee during the evacuation of the Gibraltarian civilian population during World War II from Gibraltar to Madeira. Solomon then had a meeting with the then President of Madeira Alberto João Jardim.

Levy died in St Bernard's Hospital in Gibraltar on 22 December 2016. He was 80.

References

1936 births
2016 deaths
Mayors of Gibraltar
Gibraltarian Sephardi Jews
Jewish Gibraltarian politicians